Pseudoalteromonas antarctica is a marine bacterium isolated from Antarctic coastal marine environments.

References

External links

Alteromonadales
Bacteria described in 1997